The Director of Policy Planning is the United States Department of State official in charge of the department's internal think tank, the Policy Planning Staff. In the department, the Director of Policy Planning has a rank equivalent to Assistant Secretary. The position has traditionally been held by many members of the U.S. foreign policy establishment. Former Directors of Policy Planning include two National Security Advisors, a President of the World Bank, and several presidents of the prestigious Council on Foreign Relations.

Directors of Policy Planning

References

External links
Policy Planning Staff Homepage
List of Directors of Policy Planning
University of Oxford

 
United States Department of State
 
United States diplomacy